FC Inter Cherkessk is a Russian football team from Cherkessk. It was founded in 2019 and licensed for third-tier Russian Professional Football League for the 2019–20 season. The town was represented professionally by FC Nart Cherkessk before.

The club failed to receive a PFL license for the 2021–22 season.

References

 
Association football clubs established in 2019
Football clubs in Russia
2019 establishments in Russia